Criticism and Truth is a 1966 work by Roland Barthes, first translated into English in 1987. 

The book is a response to Raymond Picard's criticism of Barthes' earlier 1963 work, Sur Racine. The feud between Barthes and Picard is credited with spreading Barthes' name outside France.

References

Books by Roland Barthes
1966 non-fiction books